Braye Beach Hotel is a 4-star hotel, considered to be the best in Alderney. The white hotel lies near the Braye Harbour on the beach in St Anne, Alderney.

References

External links
Official site

  Not in UK!

Buildings and structures in Alderney
Hotels in the Channel Islands